The Jewish General Hospital (JGH), known officially as the Sir Mortimer B. Davis Jewish General Hospital since 1978, is an acute-care teaching hospital in Montreal, Quebec, Canada. The hospital is affiliated with McGill University and has 637 beds, one of the most of a hospital site in Canada.

In 2019, Newsweek ranked the hospital 4th in Canada and 1st in Quebec.

History

The Jewish General Hospital, which opened its doors in 1934, was founded as a general hospital, open to all patients regardless of race, religion, language or ethnic background. It was founded by the Jewish community of Montreal in part as a response to the anti-Semitic "Days of Shame" doctor's strike at the Hôpital Notre-Dame in Montreal, Quebec, Canada where all interns at the hospital walked off the job for four days to protest the hiring of a Jewish senior intern, Dr. Samuel Rabinovitch and then only returned to work after Dr. Rabinovitch had resigned. While part of the Quebec medicare system, and functionally bilingual in French and English, the hospital continues to be run chiefly by members of the Jewish community.

At his death in 1928, Sir Mortimer Davis left most of his estate to be used for the construction of a Jewish public hospital that would bear his name. In 1969, the hospital opened the affiliated Lady Davis Institute for Medical Research, one of the largest and most influential research centres in Canada.

Among many other medical innovations, in 1974, the JGH was one of the first hospitals in Canada to open a division of colorectal surgery.  Among the famous alumni of the hospital is former head nurse Beverley Binder (née Rosen).

In 1978, fifty years after Davis's death, $10 million from his estate was donated to the Jewish General Hospital, which was then renamed the Sir Mortimer B. Davis Jewish General Hospital.

In 2016, the hospital opened a new pavillion as part of a $430 million expansion/renovation project. 

The provincial government of Quebec in 2018 committed $200 million towards a multi-year renovation project.

Lady Davis Institute for Medical Research
The Lady Davis Institute for Medical Research (LDI) is the research arm of the Sir Mortimer B. Davis Jewish General Hospital and has strong academic ties to McGill University.

Founded in 1969, the LDI has a roster of nearly 200 researchers, and it is an important North American biomedical research institute. LDI researchers have made major breakthroughs in the areas of HIV/AIDS, aging, cancer, vascular disease, epidemiology, and psychosocial science.

The LDI currently supports four major research axes (or programs):

 Cancer (Segal Cancer Centre)
 Epidemiology
 Molecular and Regenerative Medicine (includes stem cells, haemovascular disease, aging and HIV/AIDS)
 Psychosocial Aspects of Disease

See also
 McGill University Health Centre (MUHC)
 The Ride to Conquer Cancer

References

External links

 Jewish General Hospital

 

Hospital buildings completed in 1934
Hospitals established in 1934
Hospitals in Montreal
Jewish medical organizations
Jews and Judaism in Montreal
Côte-des-Neiges–Notre-Dame-de-Grâce
1934 establishments in Quebec